Sanna Kiero (13 September 1930 – 31 January 2010) was a Finnish cross-country skier. She competed in the women's 10 kilometres at the 1956 Winter Olympics.

Cross-country skiing results

Olympic Games

References

External links
 

1930 births
2010 deaths
Finnish female cross-country skiers
Olympic cross-country skiers of Finland
Cross-country skiers at the 1956 Winter Olympics
People from Lappeenranta
Sportspeople from South Karelia
20th-century Finnish women